Joshua David Myers (born July 16, 1998) is an American football center for the Green Bay Packers of the National Football League (NFL). He played college football at Ohio State, and was drafted by the Packers in the second round of the 2021 NFL Draft.

Early life and high school career
Myers was born in Dayton, Ohio and grew up in Miamisburg, Ohio, and attended Miamisburg High School. He was named first-team Division II All-State as a junior and senior and also played in the 2017 All-American Bowl.

College career
Myers redshirted his true freshman season as he moved from guard to center. He played in ten games as a redshirt freshman as the backup to starting center Michael Jordan. Myers was named the starting center going into his redshirt sophomore season. He played over 900 offensive snaps and was named second-team All-Big Ten Conference by the league's coaches. Myers was named a team captain going into his redshirt junior year.

Professional career

On April 30, 2021, Myers was selected in the second round (62nd overall) by the Green Bay Packers in the 2021 NFL Draft. He signed his four-year rookie contract on May 14, 2021, worth $5.58 million, including a $1.41 million signing bonus.

Myers was named the Packers starting center as a rookie, replacing All-Pro center Corey Linsley who had left for the Los Angeles Chargers. Myers started five games before suffering a knee injury in Week 6. He was placed on injured reserve on October 23, 2021. He was activated off injured reserve on January 8, 2022.

References

External links
Green Bay Packers bio
Ohio State Buckeyes bio

1998 births
Living people
People from Miamisburg, Ohio
Players of American football from Ohio
American football centers
Ohio State Buckeyes football players
Green Bay Packers players